The Judo competition at the 2003 Summer Universiade were held in Daegu, South Korea from 25 August to 27 August 2003.

Medal overview

Men's event

Women's event

Medals table

References

External links
 

2003
Universiade
2003 Summer Universiade
Judo competitions in South Korea